Hannah Cross (born 27 January 1997) is an Australian synchronised swimmer. She competed in the women's team event at the 2016 Summer Olympics. She has qualified to represent Australia at the 2020 Summer Olympics.

References

1997 births
Living people
Australian synchronised swimmers
Olympic synchronised swimmers of Australia
Synchronized swimmers at the 2016 Summer Olympics
Place of birth missing (living people)
Artistic swimmers at the 2019 World Aquatics Championships
Swimmers from Melbourne